Friedrich Eduard Fehr (24 May 1862, Werneck - 29 September 1927, Polling) was a German painter in the Historicist atyle.

Biography 
He was born to Kaspar Fehr, a notary, and his wife Anna. He initially attended the Realgymnasium in Würzburg then, from 1878 to 1884, he studied at the Academy of Fine Arts, Munich with Alexander Strähuber, Gyula Benczúr and Ludwig von Löfftz. A scholarship from the Martin von Wagner Foundation enabled him to make an extended study trip to Italy from 1885 to 1890.

In 1896, when the Karlsruhe Artists' Association was founded, he became a corresponding member; promoting lithography and etching as necessary adjuncts to an artistic education.

In 1897, he married Berta Roloff (1868–1957). Later that year, he was offered a position at the Karlsruher Akademie. In 1899, after some consideration, he accepted their offer and became head of the painting class, which he oversaw until it was discontinued in 1923. His students included Wilhelm Hempfing, Margarethe von Reinken and Alexander Kanoldt. During this period, he expanded his own work to encompass interiors and genre scenes, in a style similar to the Dutch Masters. In 1915, he took a short leave from his teaching, to paint soldiers on the front lines.

After retiring in 1924, he and his family moved to Polling, where he died three years later.

Sources
 Biography @ the Stadtlexikon Karlsruhe
 03554 Friedrich Fehr, Matrikelbuch 1841-1884 der Akademie der Bildenden Künste

External links

 More works by Fehr @ ArtNet
 

1862 births
1927 deaths
19th-century German painters
19th-century German male artists
German landscape painters
German genre painters
Academy of Fine Arts, Munich alumni
People from Schweinfurt (district)
20th-century German painters
20th-century German male artists